The 2005-06 Michigan Wolverines men's basketball team represented the University of Michigan in intercollegiate college basketball during the 2005-06 season. The team played its home games in the Crisler Arena in Ann Arbor, Michigan, and was a member of the Big Ten Conference.  Under the direction of head coach Tommy Amaker, the team finished tied for sixth in the Big Ten Conference.  The team earned a seventh seed and lost in the first round of the 2006 Big Ten Conference men's basketball tournament. The team earned an invitation to the 2006 National Invitation Tournament. The team was ranked as the 21st best team in the January 31, 2006 Associated Press Top Twenty-Five Poll but fell out of the poll two weeks later, and also ended the season unranked in the final USA Today/CNN Poll. The team had a 3–7 record against ranked opponents, with its victories coming against #25 Michigan State 72–67 on January 25, 2006 at Crisler Arena, #23 Wisconsin 85–76 on January 28, 2006 at Crisler Arena and #8 Illinois 72–64 on February 21, 2006 at Crisler Arena.

Lester Abram, Graham Brown, and Sherrod Harrell served as team co-captains, and Daniel Horton earned team MVP honors.  The team's leading scorers were Horton (581 points), Courtney Sims (360 points) and Dion Harris (343 points).  The leading rebounders were Graham Brown (240), Courtney Sims (189) and Chris Hunter (115).

Courtney Sims won the Big Ten Conference statistical championship for field goal percentage with a 63.3% mark in all of Michigan's games. Daniel Horton set the current Big Ten Conference single-season free throw percentage record of 97.8 (89 of 91) for conference games.  This, of course, led the conference for the conference season as did his 90.1% mark for all games.  The team set the current school single-season record with 200 blocked shots in 34 games surpassing the total of 193 set 36 games in 1993.

In the 2006 Big Ten Conference men's basketball tournament at the Conseco Fieldhouse from March 9–12, Michigan was seeded seventh. In the first round they lost to number 10 Minnesota 59–55.

On March 16, 2006, Michigan defeated nine seeded  82–67 at Crisler Arena in the first round of the 2006 National Invitation Tournament. Then, Michigan defeated five seeded  87–84 in double overtime and three seeded  71–65 on March 20 and March 22 at Crisler Arena, respectively.  At the final four in New York City at Madison Square Garden, the team defeated five seeded  66–43 in the semifinals on March 28 before losing to three seeded South Carolina 76–64 in the championship on March 30.

Rankings

See also
Michigan Wolverines men's basketball
2006 National Invitation Tournament
NIT all-time team records
NIT bids by school and conference
NIT championships and semifinal appearances

References

External links
stats @ ESPN

Michigan Wolverines men's basketball seasons
Michigan
Michigan
Michigan
Michigan